Patricio Alejandro Camps (born January 22, 1972 in Buenos Aires) is a former Argentine football player. He is of Ukrainian descent.

Club career
Camps joined Velez as a 14 years old in 1986, he made his breakthrough into the first team in 1991. He was part of four Argentine league championship campaigns and also won three international championships.

Camps also played for Banfield and Quilmes in Argentina, PAOK Thessaloniki FC in Greece, Tecos UAG in Mexico and Olimpia of Paraguay.

He played over 250 times for Velez Sarsfield in all competitions, winning seven major titles during the club's golden era in the 1990s.

Coaching career
After retiring, Camps joined the technical staff of José Pékerman at the Argentina national football team. The duo was there from 2004 to 2006. He followed Pékerman to Deportivo Toluca in July 2007 still as a part of his technical staff, until the next year. Camps continued alongside Pékerman to Tigres UANL in February 2008, but left already at the end of the season just four months later. In January 2012, Camps once again joined the technical staff of José Pékerman at the Colombia national football team.

With 12 years of experience as part of a technical team, Camps got his first ever manager job on 12 April 2019, when he was appointed as the manager of Santa Fe with Martín Posse as his assistant.

Titles

References

External links 
 
 Argentine Primera statistics at Futbol XXI  
 

1972 births
Footballers from Buenos Aires
Argentine footballers
Argentina international footballers
Club Atlético Vélez Sarsfield footballers
Club Atlético Banfield footballers
Quilmes Atlético Club footballers
PAOK FC players
Club Olimpia footballers
Tecos F.C. footballers
Argentine Primera División players
Super League Greece players
Liga MX players
Argentine expatriate footballers
Expatriate footballers in Greece
Expatriate footballers in Mexico
Expatriate footballers in Paraguay
Argentine people of Ukrainian descent
Living people
Independiente Santa Fe managers
Association football forwards
Argentine football managers